The Karkloof Forest is situated in the Karkloof Nature Reserve, 22 km north of Howick, KwaZulu-Natal, South Africa.

This is a large (936ha) mistbelt forest containing yellowwoods (Afrocarpus falcatus, Podocarpus latifolius and Podocarpus henkelii) and stinkwood (Ocotea bullata).

Wildlife includes Samango monkey, blue duiker and bushbuck. Crowned eagles (Stephanoaetus coronatus) breed here, and the endangered Cape parrot (Poicephalus robustus robustus) occurs here.

Endemics to the area include a subspecies of crested guineafowl (Guttera edouardi symonsi), and a dwarf chameleon (Bradypodion sp.) which is related to the Natal Midlands dwarf chameleon and the black-headed dwarf chameleon.

Other birds found here include Knysna turaco (Tauraco corythaix), forest canary (Crithagra scotops), white-starred robin (Pogonocichla stellata), orange ground-thrush (Zoothera gurneyi), red-throated wryneck (Jynx ruficollis), golden-tailed woodpecker (Campethera abingoni) and martial eagles (Polemaetus bellicosus).

See also
 Forests of KwaZulu-Natal

References

Bibliography
 Pooley, E. (1993). The Complete Field Guide to Trees of Natal, Zululand and Transkei. .
 Tolley, K. and Burger, M. 2007. Chameleons of Southern Africa. .

Geography of KwaZulu-Natal
Forests of South Africa